The Daily Tribune, also sometimes known by its subtitle News of Bahrain, is an English-language daily newspaper in Bahrain.

History and profile
The Daily Tribune belongs to the family of Arabic newspapers in Bahrain Al-Ayam Publications. The newspaper is produced and managed by the media group Mcindies Holding Company.

References

1997 establishments in Bahrain
Newspapers established in 1997
English-language newspapers published in Arab countries
Newspapers published in Bahrain